Hengam or Hangam, also rendered as Henjam, may refer to:
Hengam Island
Hengam-e Jadid
Hengam-e Qadim
Hengam Rural District (disambiguation)